Eduardo Hernández García Santamarina (born 9 July 1969) is a Mexican film, theater, and television actor who is known for his leading roles in many telenovelas. Beside Televisa telenovelas, Santamarina appeared in some Telemundo telenovelas. He is married with Mexican telenovela actress Mayrín Villanueva.

Acting career 
Santamarina took acting classes at the Centro de Educación Artística (CEA) in Mexico City from 1989 to 1991. He made his acting debut in 1992 on the set of the telenovela De frente al sol, produced by Carla Estrada. His more notable roles to date were in the telenovelas Marisol in 1996 and Rubí in 2004. He made his feature film debuts in the Mexican films Baño de Mujeres and Ya No Los Hacen Como Antes, both released in 2002. He will star as the antagonist in Emilio Larrosa's telenovela: Libre para amarte.

Personal life 
Eduardo married actress Itatí Cantoral in 2000. She gave birth to the couple's twin boys José Eduardo and Roberto Miguel in August 2000. Both Santamarina and Cantoral filed for divorce in 2003 and the marriage was formally dissolved in 2004. While still married to Cantoral, he began an on-and-off relationship with actress Susana González until their well-publicized separation in November 2007.

Currently, he is married to his Yo amo a Juan Querendón co-star, actress Mayrín Villanueva. She gave birth to their daughter Julia on 18 July 2009, via Caesarean section.

Filmography

Telenovelas

References 

1969 births
People from Veracruz (city)
Mexican male film actors
Mexican male telenovela actors
Living people
Mexican restaurateurs
Male actors from Veracruz
20th-century Mexican male actors
21st-century Mexican male actors